Drug War is a 2012 action thriller film directed and produced by Johnnie To. The film stars Sun Honglei as Police Captain Zhang, who partners with a drug lord named Timmy Choi (Louis Koo) after Choi is arrested. To avoid the death penalty, Choi agrees to reveal information about his partners' methamphetamine ring. Zhang starts to harbor doubts about Choi's honesty as the police begin to take on the drug ring.

The film premiered at the Rome Film Festival on November 15, 2012. It has received positive reviews.

Plot
Fleeing from an explosion at his drug manufacturing facility, Timmy Choi crashes his car into a restaurant and as he revives he is captured by Captain Zhang Lei. Realizing that he will receive the death penalty for his crimes, he bargains information on his colleagues to survive and introduces Captain Zhang Lei as "Uncle Bill", to become a supplier to Haha, who owns a port and can distribute drugs to other countries. Captain Zhang Lei poses as Haha to the real "Uncle Bill". Choi goes to his factory where he meets with his two mute employee brothers. Choi plants recording devices in his factory, setting up everyone in it.  Then they set up the real Haha with the real Uncle Bill.  However, an attempt to capture the mute brothers at the factory fails, and they escape through a hidden tunnel. Captain Zhang is livid at Choi for withholding information about the secret exit, which has cost the lives of several police team members.

Choi pleads for a second chance as "Uncle Bill" is really just a front for 7 influential Hong Kong gangsters whom he did not wish to rat out because 2 of them are his relatives as they are his brother and godfather. The next day, Captain Zhang poses as Haha again and meets with "Uncle Bill". They negotiate a deal to distribute drugs using Haha's port, while Choi identifies the 7 gangsters's bosses. Later they discuss terms of the deal at a nightclub, where Captain Zhang, posing as Haha, accuses "Uncle Bill" of being a cop, pretending to be infuriated. The big 7 confront him in the parking garage, revealing their identities and confirming their business relationship. On the day after that, Choi leads the big 7 and their entourage to the port, but instead pulls the entourage in front of a primary school as parents and children are arriving for the day.

Choi removes his wires and reveals to the big 7 that he has ratted them out and they are surrounded by cops. Realizing that something has gone wrong, Captain Zhang and his officers close in. A shootout ensues, and nearly all of the gangsters, along with several officers, are killed. Choi escapes in a school bus. However, he crashes into the escaping mute brothers as they are fleeing, believing that Choi has ratted them out. Another shootout takes place. Captain Zhang, wounded, arrives with several other wounded comrades to stop the mute brothers. Though the mute brothers are killed, the cops are all severely wounded from the shootout. Choi who was handcuffed earlier by Zhang escapes and uses the opportunity to fatally gun down Zhang and the other officers, but Zhang is able to handcuff himself to Choi's leg before he dies. Choi is then captured by SWAT reinforcements before he can escape. Choi begs them for another chance to live by trading more information on other gangsters, but is executed by lethal injection.

Cast
Louis Koo as Choi Tin-ming/Timmy Choi
Sun Honglei as Captain Zhang Lei
Huang Yi as Yang Xiaobei
Wallace Chung as Guo Weijun
Gao Yunxiang as Xu Guoxiang
Li Guangjie as Chen Shixiong
Guo Tao as Senior Dumb
Li Jing as Junior Dumb
Lo Hoi-pang as Birdie
Eddie Cheung as Su
Gordon Lam as East Lee
Michelle Ye as Sal
Lam Suet as Fatso

Production
The film was billed as  To's first action film to be entirely shot and set in Mainland China. To had previously shot the romance film Romancing in Thin Air in China.

Style
Variety wrote that the film does not have the same feeling as To's similar Hong Kong films such as Election or Sparrow and that the film was also "actually quite light on action." Film Business Asia noted that "To has modified his style to take account of the Mainland's different look and more spacious geography, as well as appearing to be newly energised by the challenge of what he can get away with."

Awards and nominations

Release
Drug War premiered at the Rome Film Festival on November 15, 2012. The film was the second "surprise film" from Asia at the festival, with the first being Back to 1942. The film was released on April 2, 2013 in China and earned US$13,070,000 for its opening week, coming in third place at the Chinese box office behind The Chef, the Actor, the Scoundrel and Finding Mr. Right. The film grossed a total of $23,180,000 in China. The film opened in Hong Kong on April 18, 2013 and grossed US$376,577 in its opening weekend, making it the second highest-grossing film at the Hong Kong box office, beaten only by Oblivion. The film grossed a total of US$639,155 in Hong Kong.

The film continues to maintain popularity and was highlighted in the Masters section of the 2013 San Diego Asian Film Festival.

Drug War was released on October 15, 2013 on DVD and Blu-ray Disc.

In the United Kingdom, the film's television airing was watched by 142,400 viewers on Channel 4 in 2016, making it the year's most-watched foreign language film on Channel 4 and seventh most-watched foreign language film on UK television.

Reception
Review aggregator Rotten Tomatoes gives the film a score of 94% based on 47 reviews, with an average rating of 8/10. The critical consensus states: "A taut, solidly constructed action thriller with uncommon intelligence, Drug War delivers exhilarating set pieces without skimping on sophisticated filmmaking." At Metacritic, which assigns a rating out of 100 to reviews from mainstream critics, the film has received a score of 86, based on 19 reviews. IndieWire gave the film a B rating, stating that the film confirms director Johnnie To's status as "a first-rate genre filmmaker. That said, the film does not innovate or break any new ground". Variety praised the film, stating that it was "light on action but so well-scripted and shot, it's nonetheless edge-of-your-seat material."

At the 7th Asian Film Awards, Drug War was nominated for Best Film, Best Screenwriter (Wai Ka-fai, Yau Nai-hoi, Ryker Chan, Yu Xi), and Best Editing (David Richardson, Allen Leung).

Remake

In 2014, it was announced that there would be a South Korean remake of the film. In July 2017, the film was confirmed to be directed by Lee Hae-young, starring Cho Jin-woong in the lead role and Ryu Jun-yeol as the drug dealer. The theatrical release was planned for the following year.

Notes

External links
 
 
 
 

Chinese action thriller films
Hong Kong action thriller films
2012 films
2012 action thriller films
2012 action films
Police detective films
Films about drugs
Films directed by Johnnie To
Media Asia films
Milkyway Image films
Films with screenplays by Yau Nai-hoi
Films with screenplays by Wai Ka-fai
Variance Films films
2012 thriller films
2010s Mandarin-language films
2010s Hong Kong films